Podium is a digital audio workstation software program that integrates audio recording, VST plugins and external MIDI and audio gear. An object based project structure allows for advanced media and device management.

Feature highlights include hierarchic track layout, integrated sound editor, surround sound, spline curve automation, 64-bit mixing, multiprocessing and a customizable user interface.

History
Podium is the brainchild of developer Frits Nielsen, a former user interface designer and programmer with TC Electronic. Development of Podium started in 1990, and the Zynewave company was founded in 2004 with the first public release of Podium.

Podium Free
On June 26, 2010, Zynewave released the Podium Free freeware edition of Podium to move to a freemium model. It has several resource limitations, but is otherwise identical to the commercial version of Podium. Latest Podium Free edition was released on March 11, 2014.

See also
Comparison of multitrack recording software

References

External links
Zynewave company website

Digital audio workstation software